Charles Goss may be:

Charles Goss (1864-1946) English librarian
Charles Frederic Goss (1852-1930) American clergyman and author